Papillary adenocarcinoma is a histological form of lung cancer that is diagnosed when the malignant cells of the tumor form complex papillary structures and exhibit compressive, destructive growth that replaces the normal lung tissue.

References

External links 
  World Health Organization Classification of Tumours. Pathology and Genetics of Tumours of the Lung, Pleura, Thymus and Heart (Download Page).
  Lung cancer page at the National Cancer Institute.

Lung cancer